Joseph Gabriel de Poulpiquet de Coatlès (1744 — 1789) was a French Navy officer. He served in the War of American Independence.

Biography 
Poulpiquet de Coatlès served on the 74-gun Hercule, under La Clocheterie. He took part in the Battle of the Saintes on 12 April 1782, and took over command of Hercule when La Clocheterie was killed.

In the subsequent inquiry into the events of the battle, Poulpiquet de Coatlès was both praised and admonished for his defence of Hercule and failure to come to the rescue of Ville de Paris.

Sources and references 
 Notes

References

 Bibliography
 
 

French Navy officers